Ethel Houbiers (born 14 July 1973) is a Belgian actress specializing in dubbing.

Filmography
Les moissons de l'océan (1998) (TV)
Véga (1999) (TV series)
On vous rappellera (2000) (TV)
Almodis de la Marche (2002) (TV)

Theatre
Letters From My Windmill, 1995
The Seven Who Were Hanged, 1995
Jeux de Massacre (Various), 1995
La nuit enchantée (Fairy), 1995
Le fils de Rullier (Various), 1995
Chemin Lilas (Naïri), 1996
Cendrillon (Fairy), 1996
La nuit tombe sur Alger la blanche (Ouarda), 1996
L'homo européanus c'est moi (Belgian), 1997
Madame de Sade (Mme de Saint-Fond), 1997
Le sous-vide et le manger mou, 1997
La dernière horde, 1997
Portrait de femme avec ombres (Monologue), 1998
Lit nuptial (Friend), Espace Kiron, 1997–1998
La modernité ça fait du bruit (Juliette), 1998
Escrache- Sratch (Natalia), 1998
Exercices de Colère (Woman), 1998
Letter from an Unknown Woman (Unknown Woman), Sudden Théâtre/Théâtre Hébertot, 1998–2002
Les Fourberies de Scapin (Zerbinette), 1999
Coupable d'innocence (Monologue), 1999
Lettre de Jean Racine au sujet de Phèdre (Phèdre), 1999
Le Médecin malgré lui (Jacqueline), 2000
Souvenirs d'un européen (Lotte Altman), 2000
The Seagull (Nina), 2001
Copie tordue (Girl), 2001
Conversation avec mon chien (Monologue), 2002–2003
La Musica, deuxième, Théâtre de l'opprimé, 2004
On s'voyait déjà, Théâtre Michel Galabru, 2003–2005

French dubbing
Cinema
Carla's Song (1995) - Carla
Breaking Up (1997) - Monica
The Girl of Your Dreams (1998) - Macarena Granada
Scarfies (1999) - Emma
Traffic (2000) - Rosario
Bread and Roses (2000) - Maya
The Art of War (2000) - Julia Fang
Woman on Top (2000) - Isabelle Oliveira
The Wedding Planner (2001) - Mary Fiore
Tortilla Soup (2001) - Carmen Naranjo
Joy Ride (2001) - Venna
Blow (2001) - Mirtha Jung
Waking Up in Reno (2002) - Brenda
Ali G Indahouse (2002) - Kate Hedges
Star Wars: Episode II – Attack of the Clones (2002) - Queen Jamillia
The Sum of All Fears (2002) - Dr. Cathy Muller
The Life of David Gale (2003) - Berlin
A Man Apart (2003) - Stacy Vetter
Gothika (2003) - Chloé Sava
The Terminal (2004) - Torres
The Princess Diaries 2: Royal Engagement (2004) - Miss Genovia Hildegard
Jersey Girl (2004) - Gertrude Steiney
Head in the Clouds (2004) - Mia
Van Helsing (2004) - Anna Valérius
The Day After Tomorrow (2004) - Jama
Meet the Fockers (2004) - Isabelle Villalobos
Four Brothers (2005) - Sofi
American Gangster (2007) - Eva
Vicky Cristina Barcelona (2007) - Maria Elena
Vantage Point (2008) - Veronica / Marie
Nine (2009) - Carla
Sex and the City 2 (2010) - Lydia
Cop Out (2010) - Gabriela
Grown Ups (2010) - Roxanne Chase-Feder
The Expendables (2010) - Sandra
Pirates of the Caribbean: On Stranger Tides (2011) - Angelica Teach
To Rome with Love (2012) - Anna
Savages (2012) - Elena
The Counselor (2013) - Laura
Fading Gigolo (2013) - Selima
Last Vegas (2014) - Lisa
Animated film roles
Atlantis: The Lost Empire (2001) - Audrey Ramirez
Atlantis: Milo's Return (2003) - Audrey Ramirez
Bee Movie (2007) - Human voice
Monsters vs. Aliens (2009) - Computer voice

Television
Uprising (2001) - Tosia Altman
Carnivàle (2003) - Catalina de la Rosa
The Knights of Prosperity (2007) - Esperanza Villalobos
Dirty Sexy Money (2007–2009) - Sofia Montoya
Total Drama: Revenge of the Island (2011) - Anne-Maria

Video game roles
Red Faction
Red Faction II
Red Faction: Guerrilla
Wheelman

Advertisements
Basiq Air
Bossa Nova
CNP Assurances
Costa Cruises
Cuir Center
Favela Chic
LCM Lacôme
Mercedez
L'Oréal
SEAT

References

External links
 
  Ethel  Houbiers on RS Doublage

1973 births
Living people
Belgian film actresses
Belgian stage actresses
Belgian television actresses
Belgian voice actresses
French video game actresses